Asana Journal is the only international yoga magazine published from India, both in English and Tamil, focusing on modern yoga, naturopathy and wellbeing.

Origin
Asana is the Sanskrit word for posture or seat.  It is one of the eight limbs of Yoga.

History and development
The monthly Asana International Yoga Journal was started in 1999 by Asana Andiappan.

Andiappan founded the only Yoga college and research centre recognised by Central Council for Research in Yoga and Naturopathy, Government of India and Health & Family Welfare Department, Government of Tamil Nadu and two universities in India: Manonmaniam Sundaranar University and Tamil Nadu Physical Education and Sports University.

The magazine is published by Asana Publication which is managed by Asana Andiappan Yoga & Natural Living Development Trust. Andiappan's objective is to create an international journal that provides the Yoga community with "references of therapeutic experience in Yogasana, and Naturopathy".

As yoga's popularity grew, particularly in Asia, the demand for an international journal with the Indian Yoga heritage arose. The magazine has been published in English since January 2003.

Asana publishes articles on Yoga, Ayurveda, Naturopathy, Siddha, etc. It has become a part of reference journals for many Yoga and Naturopathy related courses in India.

Asana, with PublishLike service, is now available for download from Apple App Store or Android Market.

Editorial focus
Asana focuses on the following key features:

 Yoga Tradition and History – Background about the history and foundation of the 5,000-year-old Yoga tradition
 Yoga Practice – Concepts, preparation, techniques, modifications and variations, benefits and contraindications
 Yoga Teaching – Teaching experience
 Yoga Philosophy – Philosophical ideas that unite the mind, body and spirit
 Life Style and Wellbeing – Life style beyond the physical practice
 Yoga Community – Events and activities connecting the community
 Yoga Calendar – Yoga news

Yoga events
Asana participates in several major Yoga events in the Region:

2012
25–26 February 2012: Korea Yoga Festival

28 March-1 April 2012: BaliSpirit Festival 2012

2011
27 February 2011: First All India Yoga Championship, Chennai, affiliated by Indian Yoga Federation, India

10 April 2011: Hong Kong Yogathon 2011

Affiliations
Asana Publication also publishes Yoga manuals, Yoga books and CDs.

Notes

External links
 

1999 establishments in Tamil Nadu
English-language magazines published in India
Monthly magazines published in India
Magazines about spirituality
Magazines established in 1999
Mass media in Chennai
Tamil-language magazines
Yoga periodicals